Lalsawma is an Indian social worker, writer and a Christian missionary and Pastor of the Mizoram Presbyterian Church. His contributions are reported in the reconciliation efforts between the Government of India and the Mizo National Front (MNF) on two occasions. In the wake of the March 1966 Mizo National Front uprising, the Mizoram Presbyterian Church Synod appointed missionaries for peace talks with MNF in 1969 and Lalsawma was one of two missionaries who contacted the MNF leaders. In 1982, he was again a member of the three-men delegation who held talks with MNF which, untimaltely, led to the Mizo Accord of 1986. He has written several articles and is the author of the book, Four Decades of Revivals, the Mizo Way. The Government of India awarded him the fourth highest civilian honour of the Padma Shri, in 2005, for his contributions to Indian society.

See also 

 Mizoram Presbyterian Church Synod
 Mizo National Front
 March 1966 Mizo National Front uprising
 Mizo Accord

References

External links 
 

Recipients of the Padma Shri in social work
Mizo people
Indian Presbyterian missionaries
Scholars from Mizoram
Social workers
Presbyterian missionaries in India
1930 births
2017 deaths